Don Robert Hankey (born June 13, 1943) is an American billionaire businessman, the founder of the Hankey Group, which makes most of its income from subprime car loans.

Early life
Don Robert Hankey was born on June 13, 1943 in Los Angeles, California, the son of a Los Angeles car dealer. He has a degree from University of Southern California.

Career
Hankey took over his father's Ford dealership in 1972, and built the Hankey Group, with its main business being Westlake Financial Services, which makes subprime car loans. He is also a real estate investor in Downtown Los Angeles.

As of September 2021, he had a net worth of $5.5 billion .

Personal life
He is married with four children, and lives in Malibu. His son, Don Rufus Hankey, is chairman of Nowcom, a car-lending software developer, and the Hankey Group company.

References

1943 births
American billionaires
Living people
People from Malibu, California
Businesspeople from Los Angeles
University of Southern California alumni